Horse sickness may refer to:

 African horse sickness
 Peruvian horse sickness